Contraception was illegal in Ireland from 1935 until 1980, when it was legalised with strong restrictions, later loosened. The ban reflected Catholic teachings on sexual morality.

History

Papal encyclicals 
The encyclical  (1930) followed the industrial production and widespread use of condoms that usually prevent fertilisation. It specified:

Following the marketing of "the pill" in the 1960s, a Pontifical Commission on Birth Control was set up. It has often been cited that there was a majority in favour of contraception, and that is implied in the wording of the papal encyclical. The encyclical  (1968) decreed that artificial contraception is not morally permissible.

Ban on sales 
Owning and using contraceptive devices and pills was not prohibited. However, from 1935, it was illegal to sell or to import them. During this time a loophole was used, where a device such as a condom could not be "offered for sale", but a citizen could be "invited to treat" to buy it. Also people made donations to family planning associations to obtain contraception as a "gift". The reality for almost all of the population was that contraception was unobtainable. Few outlets wanted to stock a product that could bring the attention of the police or public opprobrium.

In early 1971 Senator Mary Robinson (who would later become president) attempted to introduce the first bill proposing to liberalise the law on contraception into the Seanad, but was not allowed a reading, so it could not be discussed. On 31 March a number of supporters managed to get into the grounds of Leinster House and then broke into the building to register their protests. On 22 May 1971 a group of Irish feminists including Mary Kenny travelled to Belfast by rail and made their return to Dublin Connolly, laden with contraceptive devices, into a statement on the illogicality of the law. This provoked criticism from the Roman Catholic Church in Ireland; Thomas Ryan, Bishop of Clonfert, said that "... never before, and certainly not since penal times was the Catholic heritage of Ireland subjected to so many insidious onslaughts on the pretext of conscience, civil rights and women's liberation".

Reform
In 1973, the Supreme Court determined in McGee v. The Attorney General that there was a constitutional right to marital privacy which also allowed for the use of contraceptives. A number of bills were proposed, but none became law. Indeed, Taoiseach at the time, Jack Lynch, admitted at one point that the issue had been put "on the long finger".

The Health (Family Planning) Act 1979 limited the provision of contraceptives to ", family planning or for adequate medical reasons". Under this scheme, contraceptives could only be dispensed by a pharmacist on the presentation of a valid medical prescription from a practising doctor. The legislation did not require that the recipient of the prescription be married; however "bona fide family planning" would have made non-marital use unlikely to be authorised.

The legislation had been introduced by Charles Haughey. The reason for the compromise was the strong position of conservative elements in Irish society at the time, particularly the Roman Catholic Church which made it difficult for the government to provide for a more liberal law. Contraception was also not seen by politicians as a vote-getter at the time. Haughey described the 1979 Act as "an Irish solution to an Irish problem". Eileen Desmond, TD,  was severely critical of the legislation; describing it as hypocritical, she argued that women should make their own decisions on such matters, and contended that the Irish people and "those who have conditioned our consciences' showed greater moral concern on sexual matters than in addressing poverty". On 1 November 1980 the Act came into operation by order of the minister.

The Health (Family Planning) (Amendment) Act 1985 liberalised the law by allowing condoms and spermicides to be sold to people over 18 without having to present a prescription; however sale was limited to categories of places named in the Act. The Health (Family Planning) (Amendment) Act 1992 repealed Section 4 of the 1979 Act, as amended in 1985, and continued the provision of contraceptives without prescription, allowing sale to individuals over the age of 17. As of 2010, the 1992 Act and the Health (Family Planning) (Amendment) Act 1993 are the main Irish legislation on contraceptive and family planning services.

As well as allowing sales, Ireland's censorship laws had to be reformed to allow contraceptives to be advertised or even mentioned. As late as 1976, the Censorship of Publications Board had banned the Irish Family Planning Association's booklet "Family Planning". The Health (Family Planning) Act 1979 deleted references to "the unnatural prevention of conception" in the 1929 and 1949 censorship Acts, thus allowing publications with information about contraception to be distributed in Ireland. The Regulation of Information (Services Outside the State for the Termination of Pregnancies) Act 1995 modified the 1929, 1946 and 1967 Acts to allow publications with information about "services provided outside the State for the termination of pregnancies". 

The 8th Amendment to the Irish constitution which prevented abortion was repealed in 2018.

A small percentage of the Irish population still opposes the use of artificial contraception within marriage,  in line with Humanae Vitae, including sports personality Mickey Harte.

See also
 Irish Family Planning Association

References

History of the Republic of Ireland
Catholic Church in the Republic of Ireland
Politics of the Republic of Ireland
Birth control in Ireland
Women's rights in Ireland